Binnya Ran I (1393–1446) was king of Hanthawaddy Pegu from 1424 to 1446. As crown prince, he ended the Forty Years' War with the rival Ava Kingdom in 1423. He came to the throne after poisoning his brother King Binnya Dhammaraza in 1424. As king, Binnya Ran largely kept his kingdom at peace for much of his 20-year reign when Ava was struggling to keep its territories intact. He pursued an opportunistic policy to keep Ava weak, helping Toungoo's rebellion against Ava between 1437 and 1442 during which he placed his son as the viceroy of Toungoo. When Ava reconquered Toungoo in 1442, he did not resume a large-scale war against Ava.

Crown Prince
Binnya Ran was born to Queen Thuddhamaya and King Razadarit. After Razadarit's death, Binnya Dhammaraza became king. Binnya Ran and Binnya Kyan immediately revolted against their elder brother. Binnya Dhammaraza pacified Binnya Ran for a time by making him the heir-apparent and governor of Pathein (Bassein) and the entire Irrawaddy delta. Binnya Dhammaraza also pacified Binnya Kyan by making him governor of Martaban. But Binnya Ran was not satisfied. He soon extended his territory, and occupied Dagon (Yangon) in 1423. When Ava forces came to occupy Dala opposite Dagon, Binnya Ran presented his elder sister Shin Sawbu to Thihathu, and bought peace. Ava forces withdrew, ending the Forty Years' War between Ava and Hanthawaddy Pegu.

In 1424, Binnya Ran poisoned Binnya Dhammaraza and became the eleventh king of Hanthawaddy. His reign name, as reported in Mon language inscriptions, was Rama Razadarit (Pali: Rāma Rājādhirāj).

Reign
As king, Binnya Ran allowed Binnya Kyan to remain as governor of Martaban where the latter exercised almost independent authority. He soon became involved with the dynastic intrigues of Ava Kingdom. In 1426, Mohnyin Thado ascended the Ava throne. In 1429, his sister Shin Sawbu fled secretly from Ava back to Pegu. Binnya Ran received his elder sister with great honor. In the same year, Thinkhaya III, the governor of Toungoo sought Binnya Ran's alliance against Ava by presenting a daughter. Binnya Ran agreed and attacked Prome (Pyay) together with Toungoo governor's forces. Mohnyin Thado broke up the alliance by giving a niece, Soe Min Wimala Dewi, to Binnya Ran. The Pegu king accepted the peace offer as he did not want renewed fighting.

The alliance was one of convenience for Binnya Ran. He was happy to see that Mohnyin Thado was having trouble with Shan raids into Avan territory throughout the 1430s. When Toungoo revolted again in 1437, Binnya Ran readily provided assistance for Toungoo. With his help, Toungoo defeated Ava, and Binnya Ran's son Minsaw became the viceroy of Toungoo. However, King Minye Kyawswa I of Ava reconquered Toungoo in 1440, and appointed Tarabya, a Shan chief. For the remainder of his reign, he was content to see Ava had its hands full with Ming Chinese invasions and Shan raids.

Binnya Ran died after a reign of approximately 22 years, and was succeeded by nephew and adopted son Binnya Waru, a son of Shin Sawbu.

Historiography
Various Burmese chronicles do not agree on the key dates of the king's life.

Notes

References

Bibliography
 
 
 
 
 
 
 
 
 
 

Hanthawaddy dynasty
1446 deaths
1390s births
15th-century Burmese monarchs